Diepeveen is a surname. Notable people with the surname include:

Cees Jan Diepeveen (born 1956), Dutch field hockey player
Wilfred Diepeveen (born 1985), Dutch cricketer

Dutch-language surnames